Beebe Steven Lynk (1872–1948)  served as the professor of medical Latin botany and materia medica at the University of West Tennessee. She was an active member of the early black women's club movement, authoring a book, Advice to Colored Women in 1896.

Early life and education

Lynk was born in Mason, Tennessee, on October 24, 1872. She was the daughter of Henderson Stevens and Jule Ann (Boyce) Stevens. She earned a degree from Lane College in Jackson, Tennessee, in 1892 at the age of 20. While it is known that her graduation was in 1892, it is unknown if she attended school early or if the degree she completed was only 2 years long. Although it is unknown when Beebe started her college career, it is known that the degree she obtained was a bachelor's degree from Lane College.  While there is not accurate documentation of the curriculum for the degree Beebe Steven Lynk received at Lane College, at the time that she would have attended, the college's degree options were in preaching and teaching. Based on Lynk's future career, we can assume that she received her degree from Lane College in teaching.

Lynk gained a Ph. C. (a degree in Pharmaceutical Chemistry) from the University of West Tennessee in 1903. This was a two-year, pre-bachelor's degree, that Beebe obtained after her original bachelor's degree; in order to be able to practice and teach Pharmaceutical Chemistry.

Career

The University of West Tennessee was founded by her husband Miles Lynk in 1900 in the town of Jackson, TN but was then moved to Memphis in 1907. Under major funding from her and her husband, the university followed the motto, “ ‘for the purpose of furnishing thorough courses in the profession, regardless of race and color’ and ‘for the purpose of furnishing facilities for higher education of Afro-American youth’”. After earning her Ph.C at the university, she soon became one of the ten collegiate professors of the university (one out of 2 female). Following the Flexner Report in 1910, the university faced some challenges regarding its credibility. The purpose of this report was to analyze medical schools’ programs and standardized it across the nation. The author and developer Abraham Flexner did not critics the African American medical schools lightly and often gave them harsh criticism. In June 1908, the Council of Medical Education stated that the University of West Tennessee and two other African American medical universities unfit and suggested that doctors from these institutions should not be recognized. Despite the criticism the university stayed up until their closure in 1923, due to financial struggles.

In addition to teaching, Lynk wrote a book called Advice to Colored Women (1896) and was active in the African-American women's club movement,. An advocate for women's rights, she was a member of the National Federation of Women's Clubs, serving as Treasurer of the Tennessee State Federation of that organization. Her book reflected the organization's mission of advancing the status of African-American women through education and respectability. In 1919, Mrs. Lynk published a school textbook titled A Complete Course in Hair Straightening and Beauty Culture. In this textbook, Lynk provided chemical recipes for beauty treatments that could be done at home. In the preface of the textbook she mentions her hope that the information would provide success, happiness, and prosperity to women.

Personal life

On April 12, 1893, Lynk married Dr. Miles Vandahurst Lynk, known both as the founder, editor and publisher of Medical and Surgical Observer (the first medical journal issued by an African-American), as well as founding the University of West Tennessee.

Beebe Steven Lynk died on November 11, 1948 of carcinoma of stomach in Memphis, Tennessee. Very little information is known about her life, in part because the University of West Tennessee no longer exists. Further sources on her may be available through the Tennessee State archives.

See also
 Alice Ball
 List of African-American inventors and scientists

References

External links
 Tennessee History

1872 births
1948 deaths
American women chemists
African-American scientists
21st-century chemists
University of West Tennessee alumni
People from Tipton County, Tennessee
Scientists from Tennessee
20th-century African-American people
20th-century African-American women